Wasesa Sabuni (born 3 May 1971) is a Swedish boxer. He competed in the men's featherweight event at the 1992 Summer Olympics.

References

1971 births
Living people
Swedish male boxers
Olympic boxers of Sweden
Boxers at the 1992 Summer Olympics
Sportspeople from Bujumbura
Featherweight boxers
20th-century Swedish people